Velleda is a genus of longhorn beetles of the subfamily Lamiinae, containing the following species:

 Velleda bassamensis (Breuning, 1936)
 Velleda callizona (Chevrolat, 1855)
 Velleda murina Thomson, 1858

Species formerly placed in this genus include:

 Falsovelleda congolensis 
 Paravelleda aberrans

References

Phrissomini